The 2018–19 Bosnia and Herzegovina Football Cup was the 23rd edition of Bosnia and Herzegovina's annual football cup, and the eighteenth season of the unified competition. The winner qualified to the 2019–20 UEFA Europa League qualifying round.

FK Željezničar Sarajevo were the defending champions, but they got eliminated by NK Široki Brijeg in the first round. FK Sarajevo won the cup after beating Široki Brijeg in the final.

Participating teams
The following teams took part in the 2018–19 Bosnia and Herzegovina Football Cup.

Roman number in brackets denote the level of respective league in Bosnian football league system

Calendar

1 Draw is held to determine what team will host leg 1 and what team will host leg 2.

Bracket

First round
Played on 19 September 2018

Second round
Played on 3 October 2018

Quarter final
First legs were played on 27 February, return legs were played on 13 March

1Sloga asked the Football Association of Bosnia and Herzegovina for their match against Klis to be prolonged because of their preparations in Antalya, and according to the official announcement from the association, the proposal was approved. The match between these two teams was played on 5 March 2019.

Semi final
First legs were played on 3 April, return legs were played on 10 April

Final
First leg was played on May 8, return leg was played on May 15

First leg

Second leg

References

External links
Football Federation of Bosnia and Herzegovina
SportSport.ba

2018-19
2018–19 in Bosnia and Herzegovina football
2018–19 European domestic association football cups